Micracisella is a genus of typical bark beetles in the family Curculionidae. There are at least 20 described species in Micracisella.

Species
These 20 species belong to the genus Micracisella:

 Micracisella adnata Wood, 1971
 Micracisella divaricata Wood, 1969b
 Micracisella hondurensis Wood, 1956b
 Micracisella knulli Wood & Bright, 1992
 Micracisella mimetica Wood, 1974a
 Micracisella monadis Wood, 1969b
 Micracisella nanula Wood & Bright, 1992
 Micracisella nigra Wood, 1956b
 Micracisella nigrella Wood, 1969b
 Micracisella nitidula Wood, 1969b
 Micracisella ocellata Wood, 1974a
 Micracisella opacicollis Blackman, 1928a
 Micracisella opacithorax Schedl, 1940
 Micracisella scitula Wood, 1969b
 Micracisella serjaniae Wood, 1971
 Micracisella similis Wood, 1969b
 Micracisella squamatula Wood, 1969b
 Micracisella striata Wood, 1956b
 Micracisella subnitida Blackman, 1943
 Micracisella vescula Wood, 1969b

References

Further reading

 
 
 

Scolytinae
Articles created by Qbugbot